This is a list of people from the University of Oxford in academic disciplines.  Many were students at one (or more) of the colleges of the university, and others held fellowships at a college.

This list forms part of a series of lists of people associated with the University of Oxford; for other lists, please see the main article List of University of Oxford people.

Law

Theology and the study of religions

Historians

Classicists, Byzantinists and archaeologists

Modern languages

Philosophers

Economists

Geography

Denis Cosgrove (St Catherine's)
Andrew Goudie (Hertford and St Cross)
Emily Georgiana Kemp (Somerville)
Janelle Knox-Hayes (Green Templeton)
Diana Liverman (Linacre)
Halford John Mackinder (Christ Church) Director LSE 1903–08, Member of Parliament 1910–22
Nick Middleton (St Anne's)
Ann Varley

Anthropology and ethnography

Sociology

Politics, political philosophy, and international relations

Asian studies

Mathematicians and statisticians

Scientists

Naturalists, botanists, and zoologists

Medicine

Psychologists, psychiatrists, and physiologists of the brain

Chemists

Physicists and astronomers

Astronomers Royal
Edmund Halley (The Queen's) 1720–42
James Bradley (Balliol) 1742–62
Nathaniel Bliss (Pembroke) 1762-64
Martin Ryle (Christ Church) 1972–82

Other physicists and astronomers

Computers, electronics, and robotics

Engineering and agriculture

Geology

Meteorology

Joanna Haigh (Somerville)
Patrick McTaggart-Cowan (Corpus Christi)

References
Dictionary of Welsh Biography (The Honourable Society of Cymmrodorion of London and National Library of Wales). Cited in references as: DWB.

Notes 

 Academic